The Fiat Bravo (Type 198) is a small family car produced by Italian manufacturer Fiat from 2007 to 2014. It was introduced to the press in January 2007 in Rome, and later to the public in March at the Geneva Motor Show. A minor facelift was available from 2010, with changes to the front grille, door handles and side mirrors, new colors, as well as interior improvements. The car was launched on 21 April 2007.

European production, at the Cassino plant, ended in July 2014, being part of FCA's 5 Year Plan, presented by Sergio Marchionne on 7 May 2014. It was replaced by the Fiat Tipo and the similarly sized Fiat 500X. The Bravo was the first car to bear Fiat Automobiles' then new logo, introduced in October 2006, containing a red background in a chrome frame.

History

The car was designed at Centro Stile Fiat, while Austrian automotive company Magna Steyr engineered a large amount of the car's body. CAD engineering and computer simulations were used on a very large scale with this model and the design was finished to a very tight schedule.

For markets in the EMEA, the Bravo was produced in Fiat's Piedimonte S. Germano plant.

Blue&Me is a new feature which was first introduced with the Fiat Grande Punto, and was fitted as standard on the Bravo Dynamic and Sport. Developed with Microsoft, this system offers Bluetooth hands free use with a mobile phone. 

It is also capable of displaying SMS text on the dash screen, and it has built in voice activation. Another part of the system is the inclusion of a USB connector so that an MP3 player or USB flashcard can be plugged in, giving the car's entertainment system access to MP3 files stored on the unit.

In Australia, the Fiat Bravo was sold as the Fiat Ritmo, since Mazda Australia owns rights to the "Bravo" name (as used on a commercial vehicle). It was introduced there in February 2008, however, it was discontinued the following year, due to slow sales, only 463 units were sold in total. The Bravo was also built in Brazil from 2010 to 2016, and was sold there and throughout South America (with the exception of Argentina, Chile and Colombia, who receive the Bravo from Italy).

In January 2007, What Car? reported that Fiat was working on a station wagon version, speculated to be marketed as the Bravo MultiWagon. Despite being a production ready version of the Bravo, it was never marketed. Other sources also claimed that this was actually a facelifted of the second generation Fiat Croma, launched in October 2007.

Brazilian version
The Brazilian built Bravo went on sale in 2010 in Brazil.

Trim levels are named as: Essence (1.8), Essence Wolverine Limited Edition (1.8), Sporting (1.8), Absolute (1.8) and T-Jet (1.4T).

Brazilian production ceased in June 2016.

Engines

The Bravo was powered by three different petrol and three diesel engines. 'T-Jet' is the name of the new range of turbocharged petrol engines.

Some models of the  T-Jet version have a Sport button to give an "overboost" function. At the end of 2007, the new 1.6 L Multijet diesel engine was launched, and a more powerful  version in spring 2008. 

The  version was available with the so called "Eco" pack which features changes to the car's aerodynamics and ECU, taller gear ratios and lower rolling resistance tyres. This gives better fuel consumption and lower  emissions (119 g/km) when compared to the standard car. This engine is also Euro 5 rated. 

A new 2.0 Multijet diesel was added to lineup at the end of 2008, that slowly replaced the 1.9 16v. In 2009, the Bravo got a new "eco"  variant of the Multijet diesel. In June 2010, two petrol engines were updated, the 1.4 T-Jet is fitted with the new Multiair technology, and the base 1.4 T-Jet was also updated to Euro 5 specification.

Petrol

Diesel

Safety
The Fiat Bravo passed the Euro NCAP car safety tests, with following ratings:

References

External links

 

Bravo
Compact cars
Euro NCAP small family cars
Hatchbacks
2010s cars
Cars introduced in 2007
Front-wheel-drive vehicles
Cars of Brazil